Bob and Carol Look for Treasure was the first story produced by the BBC as part of their Look and Read programme.  The ten part serial was filmed, in September 1966, with the intention of being shown as part of the BBC's Merry-Go-Round series but was instead broadcast, between January and March 1967, as part of their new Look and Read format.

The story featured many of the elements which would become standard for the programme over the years.  These included children having to solve clues and puzzles to forward the story, which took the form of a mystery tale.

Story
The serial was split into two separate and distinct sections; the first six parts known as "The Lost Treasure" and the last four as "The Stolen Treasure".

"The Lost Treasure"
A young girl, Carol, is sent to deliver eggs to Miss Brown who looks after a large old house.  Whilst there, Carol spots a small porcelain Chinese statue.  Miss Brown is about to tell Carol a secret of the statue when she is interrupted by Carol's goat, Bella, who is eating her flowers.  Carol chases after the goat and meets a boy named Bob sitting under a tree.  He tells Carol that he lives in a canal boat and after the two children capture Bella, he shows her round his home.  Whilst on the boat, Carol spots a statue which looks almost identical to the one in the big house.  On the bottom of this statue the children find part of a message that Bob says is a clue that will lead them to some treasure.  They take the statue to Miss Brown who tells them about a rich man, Adam Kent, who once lived in the house.  Before he died, he left clues, leading to the location of his fortune, on the bottom of two statues, which were intended to go to each of his two sons.

Combining the clues on the two statues, Carol and Bob set off to find the treasure.  They find a marked stone, cross a canal and make their way to the village of King's Mill where they find a well which leads them back to a stone in the grounds of the house.  When the get back to the house they meet a rude fat man with a motorbike who they help after he drops his radio, though he turns out to be ungrateful.  They tell Miss Brown that they know where to find treasure and she gets a gardener to come and help them unearth it.  They leave thinking that the house is empty but secretly the fat man lurks inside.  Under the stone they find a brown bag filled with gold, silver and two big golden cups.  They decide to take the treasure into the house, leaving Bob to look after Bella but when they get back into the house they discover that a picture of Adam Kent has gone missing, so Carol runs out to tell Bob whilst Miss Brown phones the police.  When Carol and Bob get back to the house they find that the treasure is gone too.

"The Stolen Treasure"
The following day, newspapers report the theft of the treasure from the big house.  Bob and Carol can't think of a way to get the treasure back so Carol takes a trip up the canal with Bob and his dad.  When they stop at a lock, the children go for a walk and spot what Bob think is the fat man's motorbike.  They suspect the man of the theft of the treasure and so they hide out in a shed, which contains some radio equipment, waiting for him to return for his bike.  Eventually, instead of the fat man, Mike, who lives next to the lock, goes to the bike.  Suddenly a boy, called Dan, comes out from behind them and tells them they shouldn't be there.  They find out that they were mistaken about the bike and ask about the radio equipment which Mike lets Dan explain to them.  As they listen in on the radio they hear some strange messages to someone called "Number One" about sending the "Red Dragon".  Bob and Carol quickly realise that the voice is that of the fat man and that he has the picture and the treasure.

Dan offers to help the two find the Red Dragon which they think might be a boat.  Bob and Dan search the canal, leaving Carol to listen to the radio, but they find nothing.  Carol decides to go look for herself and ends up in a boat house where she hears the fat man's voice.  He makes an appointment to send the painting on the Red Dragon at 4pm in a park.  He locks the door of the boat house leaving Carol trapped.  As the afternoon passes she decides that she must do something so she sends a message in a bottle down the canal with the hope that the boys will pick it up.  Bob spots it in the water and they rush to the boat house, freeing Carol with only half an hour left to get to the park.  They tell Mike of their dilemma and then race to the park, Bob and Dan on their bikes, Carol and Mike on his motorbike.  When they reach the park they split up and look for the fat man.  Bob and Dan see a man wearing black glasses with a motorised toy boat painted red and green.  Bob asks the man how the boat works and spots that it is named the Red Dragon.  As the boat rushes across the water Carol and Mike spot the fat man who lifts the boat from the water and puts something on it before putting it back in.  He notices Carol and Mike and runs off with a blue bag.  The four chase after him but he gets away.  They see Number One on a motor boat heading up the canal and Mike points out that they can stop him at Five Locks and so they call the police.  At the locks the fat man and Number One become trapped and the police arrest them, finding the picture in the Red Dragon and the treasure in the blue bag.

Cast
Jean Anderson as Miss Brown
Veronica Purnell as Carol
Stephen Leigh as Bob
Charles Leno as Adam Kent
Sean Barrett as Will Kent
Simon Lanzon as Robert Kent
Robert Bridges as the Fat Man
Peter Hempson as Mike
Carl Gonzales as Dan
Frank Duncan as Number One
Trevor Lloyd as the policeman
Tom Gibbs - Introductions

Crew
Writer - Joy Thwaytes
Producer - Claire Chovil
Devised by Joyce M. Morris

See also
Look and Read
Len and the River Mob
Dark Towers
Geordie Racer
Through the Dragon's Eye
Earth Warp

External links
 https://web.archive.org/web/20080213185117/http://www.lookingandseeing.co.uk/site/Look_and_Read/Bob_and_Carol_Look_for_Treasure

Look and Read